is a Japanese romance  manga series written and illustrated by Mari Fujimura. It was serialized in Shueisha's Cocohana magazine from November 28, 2011, to January 28, 2013, with its chapters compiled into thirteen volumes. A live-action television drama adaptation aired on Nippon TV in Japan from October 15, 2014, to December 17, 2014.

Volumes

Reception
The series was number three on the 2013  Top 20 Manga for Female Readers survey. It was number eleven in Zenkoku Shotenin ga Eranda Osusume Comic 2013, a 2013 ranking of the top 15 manga recommended by Japanese bookstores. It was number two on the Book of the Year list of Female-Oriented Comics from January to June, 2013 by Da Vinci magazine It was number nine in the 2013 Comic Natalie Grand Prize.

As of September 2, 2012, volume 1 has sold 86,094 copies, and volume 2 has sold 67,247 copies. By March 16, 2013, volume 3 had sold 239,277 copies, and it was the 95th best-selling manga volume in the period of November 19, 2012, to November 17, 2013, with 428,163 copies sold. As of August 18, 2013, volume 4 has sold 327,977 copies.

References

External links
 Kyō wa Kaisha Yasumimasu. at Shueisha 
 
 Kyō wa Kaisha Yasumimasu. at Nippon TV 
 

2011 manga
2014 Japanese television series debuts
2014 Japanese television series endings
Japanese television dramas based on manga
Josei manga
Manga series
Romance anime and manga
Shueisha manga
Slice of life anime and manga